is a professional Japanese football player who currently plays as a goalkeeper.

Youth career
Kishigami started his career with Albirex Niigata (S) in the S.League. He has since appeared in 13 matches in the league so far, contributing two cleansheets in the 2014 Singapore Cup as well.

References

External links
Profile at Nara Club

1991 births
Living people
Japanese footballers
Association football forwards
People from Kaizuka, Osaka
Sportspeople from Osaka Prefecture
Nara Club players
Japan Football League players

Association football goalkeepers